The 1994 Texas gubernatorial election was held on November 8, 1994, to elect the governor of Texas. Incumbent Democratic Governor Ann Richards was defeated in her bid for re-election by Republican nominee George W. Bush, the son of former President George H. W. Bush.

Before the election, Richards had a high approval rating due to the strength of the state economy. However, Bush's campaigning on cultural and religious issues resonated with many Texan voters, and the race was considered a tossup on election day.

On election day, Bush carried 188 of the state's 254 counties, while Richards carried 66. Exit polls revealed that Bush won overwhelmingly among white voters (69% to 31%) while Richards performed well among African Americans (83% to 15%) and Latinos (75% to 25%). The 1994 election marked the last time that a Democrat won more than 45% of the vote in a Texas gubernatorial election, though the party was more successful in other statewide offices: Lieutenant Governor Bob Bullock, Attorney General Dan Morales, Land Commissioner Garry Mauro and Comptroller John Sharp all won reelection.

Bush's victory was one of the most notable in the 1994 Republican Revolution, as he was one of four candidates to defeat an incumbent governor that cycle. As of 2023, this is the last time an incumbent Governor of Texas lost re-election.

Primaries

Republican

Democratic

Campaign

On June 11, 1994, 54 delegates met at the Libertarian state convention to statewide nominees. Keary Ehlers was given the gubernatorial nomination and the other statewide nominees were selected on June 12. Tom Pauken, the chairman of the Republican Party of Texas, stated that Keary Ehlers should withdraw to help Bush win the election. Jay Manifold, the chairman of the Libertarian Party of Texas, stated that Bush should withdraw to help Ehlers win the election in response.

Polling

Endorsements

Results

References

1994
Gubernatorial
Texas
George W. Bush